Belovsky (masculine), Belovskaya (feminine), or Belovskoye (neuter) is the name of several rural localities in Russia:
Belovsky, Altai Krai, a settlement in Belovsky Selsoviet of Troitsky District of Altai Krai
Belovsky, Oryol Oblast, a settlement in Dubovitsky Selsoviet of Maloarkhangelsky District of Oryol Oblast
Belovsky, Stavropol Krai, a khutor in Kochubeyevsky District of Stavropol Krai
Belovskoye, Belgorod Oblast, a selo in Belgorodsky District of Belgorod Oblast
Belovskoye, Ivanovo Oblast, a village in Rodnikovsky District of Ivanovo Oblast
Belovskoye, Yaroslavl Oblast, a village in Shashkovsky Rural Okrug of Rybinsky District of Yaroslavl Oblast
Belovskaya, Moscow Oblast, a village in Dmitrovskoye Rural Settlement of Shatursky District of Moscow Oblast
Belovskaya, Nizhny Novgorod Oblast, a village in Kocherginsky Selsoviet of Balakhninsky District of Nizhny Novgorod Oblast
Belovskaya, Vologda Oblast, a village in Avksentyevsky Selsoviet of Ust-Kubinsky District of Vologda Oblast
Belovskaya, Nekouzsky Rural Okrug, Nekouzsky District, Yaroslavl Oblast, a village in Nekouzsky Rural Okrug of Nekouzsky District of Yaroslavl Oblast
Belovskaya, Novinsky Rural Okrug, Nekouzsky District, Yaroslavl Oblast, a village in Novinsky Rural Okrug of Nekouzsky District of Yaroslavl Oblast